= Albatha =

Conglomerate based in Dubai, United Arab Emirates

- Company type: Diversified Industrial Group
- Industry: Diversified Conglomerate
- Founded: Early 1950s
- Headquarters: Dubai, United Arab Emirates
- Services: Automotive; Healthcare; Manufacturing; Engineering; Electronics; FMCG; Food industry; Real estate
- Number of employees: Over 7,000
- Subsidiaries: Albatha Automotive; Albatha Consumer; Albatha Engineering; Albatha Healthcare; Albatha Home & Personal Care; Albatha Retail & Home Products; Albatha Real Estate
- Website: www.albatha.com

Albatha (stylised as albatha) is a conglomerate based in the United Arab Emirates.

== History ==
Albatha was founded in early 1950s by Sheikh Mohammed bin Sultan Al Qasimi.

== Overview ==
The Albatha group comprises over 28 companies in sectors such as Automotive, Healthcare, Manufacturing, Engineering, Electronics, FMCG, Food and Real Estate. These companies have been organized in seven industry-sector groups. The Albatha group has expanded their business beyond the United Arab Emirates.

Albatha has partnered with over 200 international corporations in various sectors and geographies.
